Avice Landone (1 September 191012 June 1976) was an English actress who appeared in British television and film.

She was born in Quetta, British India, and made her screen debut in the 1948 film My Brother Jonathon. From 1961 she co-starred with Peggy Mount in the ITV sitcom Winning Widows. Between 1970 and 1972 she played Margaret Brown in the television series Man at the Top.

She was married to the actor Bruno Barnabe (1905–1998). She retired from acting in 1972 and died in 1976, aged 65, from undisclosed causes.

Filmography

Selected theatre roles
 Great Day (1945) by Lesley Storm
 A Lady Mislaid (1950) by Kenneth Horne
 And This Was Odd (1951) by Kenneth Horne
 Not in the Book (1958) by Arthur Watkyn

References

1910 births
1976 deaths
English film actresses
English television actresses
People from Quetta
20th-century English actresses
British people in colonial India
20th-century British businesspeople